Thomasia microphylla is a species of flowering plant in the family Malvaceae and is endemic to the south-west of Western Australia. It is an erect, spreading shrub with egg-shaped leaves and racemes of pale pink or mauve flowers.

Description
The sepals are pale pink or mauve, the petals minute. Flowering occurs from August to November.

Taxonomy
Thomasia microphylla was first formally described in 1974 by Susan Paust in the journal Nuytsia from specimens collected by Alex George near the Ravensthorpe Range in 1963. The specific epithet (microphylla) means "small-leaved".

Distribution and habitat
This thomasia grows in sandy coastal heath, on laterite, loam or clay in the Esperance Plains and Mallee bioregions in the south of Western Australia.

Conservation status
Thomasia microphylla is listed as "not threatened" by the Government of Western Australia Department of Biodiversity, Conservation and Attractions.

References

microphylla
Rosids of Western Australia
Plants described in 1974